Mina canta i Beatles, released on 11 June 1993, is an album by Italian singer Mina.

Background 
Mina canta i Beatles was published uncharacteristically in June 1993. For the past few albums Mina released a double album annually in the fall of each year. This album is "a hard modern take on The Beatles music, incorporating intelligence and technology". Mina canta i Beatles features eleven songs, of which only six were recorded in 1993. The remaining five songs were recorded by Mina at various times in her career when she ventured into the Beatles songbook. While the songs do not eclipse the original versions, they are interpreted in classical Mina style with interesting vocal arrangements.

The album starts with the track "Something", a song written by George Harrison taken from the iconic Abbey Road (1969), and played here on brushes and flugelhorn. Mina had recorded the song previously in a symphonic version for the album Mina of 1971.

The track "Let It Be" has an eccentric opening as it starts "as a march of Kurt Weill, with the sound of an accordion, the sounds and the voices of a fair".

The mood shifts for the track "The Fool on the Hill" where Mina sings over a light rhythm of the bossa nova.

On the track "When I'm Sixty-Four", Mina hums in Italian as the 78 laps of the Trio Lescano play on.

The track "The Long and Winding Road" is counterpointed by a romantic piano while on "Yesterday" Mina becomes "careful and respectful and does not deviate too much from the original arrangement with the classic of classics".

Mina had already recorded the tracks "Michelle" and "My Love" on her 1976 album Plurale, "She's Leaving Home" on her 1980 album Kyrie, "Hey Jude" on her 1984 album Catene and "Oh! Darling" on her 1989 album Uiallalla.

In Mina canta i Beatles, Mina "sings as if this were recorded live at a club. The songs are soft and loose, cementing her as a great interpreter without exaggeration or needing to prove that force is the cleverest. The songs are sung with naturalness, a simplicity that, coupled with her vocal abilities, makes for a splendid listening experience".

The weekly magazine Noi released an article about the album to coincide with the album’s release. The article was written by Mina herself, who is a regularly collaborator of the magazine. The article explains how Mina discovered the music of the Beatles and how she approached the album:  When I was younger, if I listened to them no matter the reason or location I was immediately smitten with their music. I did not know who they were initially, but I realized that I was living in a memorable historic event. Like virtually every other person at that stage in music, I was struck by their melodies and lyrics, their music contained a uniformity of emotions, passion all encompassed in a single song. This was at the time really a phenomenon for all and I am sure I was not the only one who experienced this admiration for their music.

Cover 
The album cover is almost a replica of the Revolver album by the Beatles released in 1966. Only instead of Beatles, logically the design of the face of Mina replicated four times. The designs of the face of Mina are taken from the singer's previous covers (starting from 'top left): Sorelle Lumière (Picture inside sleeve), Catene, Minacantalucio, Rane supreme.

Tracks

References

1990 albums
Mina (Italian singer) albums
The Beatles tribute albums